San Cristóbal is a district of the Alto Paraná Department, Paraguay.